Zamia macrochiera is a species of plant in the family Zamiaceae. It is endemic to Peru. It is found near the towns of Pebas and Pucaurquillo in Maynas Province, Loreto Region; plants are found near the Rio Amiyacu and Rio Napo. It is threatened by habitat loss, and is considered critically endangered by the IUCN.

References

Flora of Peru
macrochiera
Critically endangered plants
Taxonomy articles created by Polbot